Niko Palhares (born February 24, 1966) is a Brazilian former racing driver.

Palhares began in Formula Ford and won the Formula Ford Festival in 1989. He moved to the British Formula Three Championship in 1990 competing in 6 races but not scoring. He moved to Italian F3 the next year and finished 11th in points. He was second in Italian F3 in 1992 with two race wins. In 1993 he competed in four Japanese F3 races and finished 12th in points. After taking 1994 off from high-level racing, he competed in the American Indy Lights series in 1995 for PacWest Racing for the first four races of the season with a best finish of 8th at Phoenix International Raceway and finishing 20th in points. That was the end of his professional racing career.

External links

Niko Palhares Indy Lights stats at ChampCarStats.com

1966 births
Brazilian racing drivers
Formula Ford drivers
British Formula Three Championship drivers
Italian Formula Three Championship drivers
Japanese Formula 3 Championship drivers
Indy Lights drivers
Living people

PacWest Racing drivers